A prosthetic testicle is an artificial replacement for a testicle lost through surgery or  injury. Consisting of a plastic ovoid manufactured from silicone rubber, and either solid, or filled with a salt solution and implanted in the scrotum, a prosthetic testicle provides the appearance and feel of a testis and prevents scrotum shrinkage. It is also commonly used in female-to-male sex reassignment surgery.

The list shows testicular implants available in the market in 2020.

See also 
 Prosthesis
 Reconstructive surgery

References 

Prosthetics
Gender-affirming surgery (female-to-male)
Intersex and medicine
Implants (medicine)